Durgadi Fort is a fort located in Kalyan, near Mumbai in Maharashtra, India.

The fort has a Hindu temple and a masjid at the top, which has religious significance for both Hindus and Muslims. It has witnessed riots in the past and is considered communally sensitive. A team of State Reserve Police Force personnel is deployed for security.

History 

The fort's construction started during Shah Jahan's reign and was completed in Aurangzeb's reign in 1694 AD. Durgadi Fort is built on a hill beside the Kalyan creek. The fort came under Marathas when Chhatrapati Shivaji Maharaj captured Kalyan and Bhiwandi from Adilshah in 1654. Chhatrapati Shivaji Maharaj built the fort close to the creek and used it as a dock to build boats and ships. During British Raj, stones from the fort wall were used to construct the Kalyan and Thane piers.

Under the rule of Marathas, a new gate about 150 feet to the south of the Ganesh Gate was opened near the mansion of Maratha General Ramji Mahadev Biwalkar. In the citadel of the fort, Marathas built a small temple of Hindu goddess Durga and named the fort Durgadi in honor of the goddess, a name it still bears. The original idol of the goddess Durga was stolen in 1876.

Chhatrapati Shivaji Maharaj used the fort as dock and began the work of the first Navy of Hindavi Swarajya and he hired 340 Portuguese artisans to build the naval docks. Later, the fort was repaired by Ramji Mahadev Biwalkar. 

In 1682, Moghul Sardar Hasan Ali Khan captured the fort, later recaptured by Chhatrapati Sambhaji Maharaj, the second Chhatrapati of the Maratha Empire. However, the Moghuls took it over again in 1689. It later came under Peshwas. In 1728, the Portuguese attacked the fort but were repelled by Shankarji Keshav Phadke, a Peshwa commander.

The Kalyan Dombivli Municipal Corporation has built a new gate and made a garden around the fort.

Durgadi Temple 

It is believed that Chhatrapati Shivaji Maharaj himself built Durgadi Temple, dedicated to the Hindu goddess Durga on Durgadi fort.  The Shiv Sena chief Bal Thackeray had started the Navaratri celebrations at the temple, which still continues. On the occasion of the Navratri, the temple is visited by devotees from Mumbai, Thane, Raigad and Palghar districts.

In 2018, the temple was visited by about 7 lakh devotees during the Navratri festival.

1967 Communal tension 
In 1967, a communal tension arose in Kalyan over the temple on Durgadi Fort, on which both Hindu and Muslim community had their claims. While local Hindus believed the shrine atop the fort was that of Hindu goddess Durga, the Muslims claimed it to be a mosque and began performing namaaz near the temple. When Shiv Sena supremo Bal Thackeray got to know about the matter, he declared that Shiv Sena would unfurl the saffron flag atop the Durgadi Fort on 8 September 1967. Then the Navratri festival came, and Chief Minister Vasantrao Phulsing Naik announced a ban on the puja at the Durgadi temple. Still, despite the ban, Shiv Sena workers and Theckeray defied the ban and performed the Puja and religious ceremony at the shrine.

Photogallery

References 

Forts in Maharashtra
History of Thane district
Tourist attractions in Thane district
Forts around Mumbai